Things We Deeply Feel the fourth album release for The Archers and their first release for the West Coast’s powerful CCM franchise, Light Records. The record company went all out for the project, bringing in some of Hollywood’s top studio players, including several Steely Dan alumni. Released before national charts were created, it spawned several top airplay list hits, including the #1 “It Wouldn’t Be Enough”.

Track listing 
"Music (He Brings A New Song)" (Billy Rush Masters, Cole) – 3:35
"Giver Of Life" (Masters) – 3:27
"Sit Yourself Down" (Nancye Short-Tsapralis) – 2:54
"Lord You’ve Being Good To Me" (Andrae Crouch) – 2:47
"It Wouldn’t Be Enough" (Aldridge) – 3:59
"I’m With Jesus" (D. Erwin) – 3:15
"Brand New Day" (Masters) – 3:31
"You Are My Inspiration" (Masters) – 2:58
"If You Can’t Believe In Love" (Paxton, Hellard) – 3:17
"It’s Love To Me" (Masters, Aldridge) – 3:01
"Praise Him" (Masters, Aldridge) – 2:52

Personnel
Jay Graydon – guitar
Ben Benay – guitar
Lee Ritenour – guitar
Dan Ferguson – guitar
Red Rhodes – pedal steel
Leland Sklar – bass
David Paich – keyboards
Ed Green – drums
Hal Blaine – drums
Allan Estes – percussion
Harold Hensley – electric fiddle
Hy Lesnick – orchestra conductor

References

External links
Archers.org
Light album discography

The Archers (musical group) albums
1975 albums